Black Creek (also New Hudson Corners) is a hamlet in the town of New Hudson, in Allegany County, New York, United States. The name is derived from a stream that flows nearby. The community lies between Cuba and Belfast on Route 305. Black Creek has a large population of Amish citizens.

The United States Postal Service operates a post office in Black Creek with the ZIP code 14714.

References

Hamlets in New York (state)
Hamlets in Allegany County, New York